The City Loop (originally called the Melbourne Underground Rail Loop or MURL) is a piece of underground commuter rail infrastructure in the central business district (CBD) of Melbourne, Victoria, Australia.

The Loop includes three underground stations: Flagstaff, Melbourne Central (formerly Museum) and Parliament. The Loop connects to Melbourne's two busiest stations, Flinders Street and Southern Cross, and together with the Flinders Street Viaduct forms a ring of four individual tracks around the CBD. 

Eleven metropolitan lines of the Melbourne rail network run through the City Loop, organised into four separate groups, the Burnley, Caulfield, Clifton Hill, and Northern groups. Each group has its own dedicated single-track tunnel, with trains running on balloon loops around the CBD. The Loop follows La Trobe and Spring Streets along the northern and eastern edges of the CBD's street grid.  

Although concepts for an underground railway had been raised since the 1920s, planning was not seriously progressed until the 1960s. The 1970 Melbourne Underground Rail Loop Act finalised the design and established an authority to oversee construction of the project. Tunnelling works began in 1972 and the Loop commenced operation in 1981 with the opening of Museum station, now Melbourne Central. The loop was fully complete in 1985 with the opening of Flagstaff station. 

A new CBD rail tunnel, the Metro Tunnel, is current under construction to relieve pressure on the City Loop, and when it opens in 2025 will see the Pakenham, Cranbourne and Sunbury metropolitan lines removed from the loop.

History
Before the Loop was constructed, Flinders Street and Spencer Street (now called Southern Cross) stations were connected only by the four track Flinders Street Viaduct besides the Yarra River. The suburban terminus of Flinders Street had become seriously congested by the 1970s, with a throughput of only ten trains per platform per hour (roughly 1,700 trains a day) — compared to a maximum of 24 if there was through running. Many trains were through routed from the southern and eastern suburbs to the north and west, but the flow was imbalanced and a number of trains were required to reverse their direction. The Epping and Hurstbridge lines stood alone from the rest of the network, having Princes Bridge station for their own exclusive use.

Several plans had been proposed over the preceding decades to alleviate the bottleneck. The one that was adopted was the building of a circular railway allowing trains to continue past Flinders Street, turn around and return to the suburbs. It was expected to boost platform capacity, allowing more trains per platform per hour on the same number of Flinders Street platforms. The loop would also bring train commuters directly into the northern and eastern sections of the CBD, delivering workers closer to their offices, students closer to RMIT University, and government officials directly to the Parliament buildings. Although the city's tram network already covered the CBD extensively, trams are not as efficient as trains when bringing large numbers of commuters into the city.

Planning
Plans for an underground city railway in Melbourne are almost as old as electrification of the network itself. In 1929, the Metropolitan Town Planning Commission released a report recommending an underground city bypass from Richmond to North Melbourne stations via Exhibition and Victoria streets. The 1940 Victorian Railways Ashworth Improvement Plan recommended a different approach, with additional platforms at the Flinders Street/Princes Bridge station complex to be built over two levels, along with a connection to an underground City Railway. The Victorian Railways promoted another route in 1950 as part of the Operation Phoenix rehabilitation plan, the line running from Richmond towards Jolimont station, under the Fitzroy Gardens and Lonsdale Street then turning north to North Melbourne station. A branch line turned north from William Street, and went through the Flagstaff Gardens. In 1954 the Melbourne & Metropolitan Board of Works released their Planning Scheme for Melbourne report, which included the Richmond – North Melbourne Lonsdale Street route.

A Parliamentary Committee on Public Works reported favourably on a city loop in 1954, and in 1958 a City Underground Railway Committee was appointed by the Transport Minister. It stated bluntly that the aim of the loop was not just to relieve crowding at Flinders Street, but to win back patronage from private cars, and if it did not then the project was a waste of time and resources. The plan included four stations, being cut to the present three by the elimination of one under Latrobe Street.

The 'City of Melbourne Underground Railway Construction Act' was passed in 1960, and test bores were sunk by the Mines Department in 1961, but no funding was provided. Throughout the next few years many proposals were made for providing more car parking in the city, so in 1963 the Government set up the Metropolitan Transportation Committee to look at both road and rail transport. It released a report in 1965 that included the same rail plan as the 1960 Act.

Construction

Following the 1969 Melbourne Transportation Plan, the Melbourne Underground Rail Loop Act 1970 was brought forward by Transport Minister Vernon Wilcox, with the Melbourne Underground Rail Loop Authority (MURLA) created on 1 January 1971 to oversee the construction and operation of the Loop. The City of Melbourne, the Melbourne and Metropolitan Board of Works and the Victorian Railways all made annual contributions to support the operating costs of the authority. Requests were made to the Federal Government for funding but no assistance was given.

Funding of the project was through debentures, with the State Government paying 60% of the cost, while a special city levy from 1963 was to fund the remainder. The levy was to be in place for forty years (until 2003), but was ended in 1995. A consortium of four engineering companies was established to construct the project: one from Australia, one from the United Kingdom, one from Canada and one from the United States of America. The first sod was turned in the middle of Jolimont Yard on 22 June 1971 by then Transport Minister Vernon Wilcox.

Tunnelling works under the city streets commenced in June 1972, using a tunnel boring machine built by Richmond engineering firm Jaques Limited. as well as conventional boring methods. At North Melbourne, Spencer Street and Jolimont Yard, cut and cover tunnelling was used to build the access ramps, with the above ground running lines being slewed from time to time as work proceeded. The first completed tunnel was the Burnley Loop, with the final breakthrough made on 8 June 1977 near the Museum station site.

The Loop comprises four single-track tunnels on two levels, and the use of four pre-existing elevated tracks between Flinders Street and Spencer Street stations. A new double track concrete viaduct was erected beside the existing quadruple track Flinders Street Viaduct in order to replace capacity for non-loop trains. Construction began in 1975 and was completed in 1978. Of the three new stations, Museum was built using the cut and cover method in a  box, while Flagstaff and Parliament were excavated using mining methods. During the excavation of Museum station, La Trobe Street and its tram tracks were temporarily relocated from December 1973 to the south onto the site of what is now the Melbourne Central Shopping Centre, and were moved back in 1978.

At the time of construction Parliament station had the Southern Hemisphere's longest escalators.
The traction power was turned on in October 1980, and the first test train ran on 4 December 1980. In 1965, the cost of the project had been estimated at between £30 and £35 million, but by 1975, high inflation had resulted in it rising to $255,600,000. While the final cost was $500 million, it resulted in the reversal of a 30-year trend of falling suburban rail patronage.

Opening
Queen Elizabeth II toured Museum station during her visit to Australia in May 1980, and opened the plaza on top of the Swanston Street entrance, which was named Queen Elizabeth Plaza. Two short documentary films, Loop and Action Loop, were commissioned by the MURLA to advertise the new railway to Melburnians, as well as abroad. A third film was planned, but never shot.The Loop was opened gradually between 1981 and 1985. Museum station and the Burnley and Caulfield tunnels opened first, on 24 January 1981. The City Circle tunnel opened with special services on 6 December 1981, and Clifton Hill services started using the Loop on 31 October 1982. Parliament station opened on 22 January 1983, the Northern tunnel on 7 January 1985 (14 January 1985 with limited services) and Flagstaff station on 27 May 1985.

Recent
In 2021, 7-car High Capacity Metro Trains were introduced to the City Loop on the Caulfield tunnel. As part of this, signalling infrastructure was altered and operations of the Caulfield loop were changed to run consistently anti-clockwise all-day around the city.

In January 2023, the City Loop and its three stations were closed for two weeks to allow for major safety upgrades to the stations and tunnels. The works will upgrade smoke detection systems, extraction systems, fire detection, fire hydrants, CCTV, and intruder-detection systems. The upgrade was originally started under the Napthine Liberal government in 2014 and was significant delayed after the collapse of the contractor while works were underway. The cost ballooned from an estimated $43 million in 2014 to $469 million in 2023.

Future

Metro Tunnel

Construction began in 2017 on the Metro Tunnel, a new heavy rail tunnel through the Melbourne Central Business District designed to relieve congestion on the City Loop tunnels. The 9km dual tunnels are set to open by 2025. The north-south tunnels were first recommended by the Eddington Transport Study in 2008 as a way to increase the central city's rail capacity. The tunnel involves the construction of five new underground stations at Arden, Parkville, State Library, Town Hall and Anzac. There will be direct underground pedestrian interchanges with City Loop and other metropolitan services at State Library with Melbourne Central station, and at Town Hall with Flinders Street station.

This Metro Tunnel will create a new cross-city rail corridor, upgrading and connecting the Pakenham and Cranbourne lines in Melbourne's south-east to the Sunbury line in Melbourne's north-west. Once complete the Cranbourne, Pakenham and Sunbury lines will be taken out of the City Loop, allowing for an increase in services on the Craigieburn and Upfield lines. The Frankston line will be returned to the City Loop and have dedicated use in the Caulfield tunnel, while Sandringham line trains will run through to Williamstown and Werribee via the Flinders Street Viaduct.

Reconfiguration

The Network Development Plan Metropolitan Rail in 2012 proposed reconfiguring the City Loop. Once complete, the reconfiguration would help the network to run seven independent lines with dedicated access in the CBD. The proposal was again included in the 30-year Infrastructure Strategy for 2021–2051 from the independent government advisory body Infrastructure Victoria, as recommendation 60.

The project would see up to three kilometres of new tunnel built, creating new entrances to the existing City Loop tunnels. Two of the four City Loop tunnels would be 'split' from the loop, and run as an independent pair of underground cross-city tracks from Richmond station to North Melbourne station. This would allow more trains to pass through the city rather than travelling around the City Loop, and would free up a pair of tracks between Flinders Street station and Southern Cross on the Flinders Street Viaduct for a second cross-city route. According to Infrastructure Victoria, the project would deliver two-thirds of the capacity uplift of the Metro Tunnel for a fraction of the cost.

The main purpose of reconfiguring the City Loop is to allow more services to operate across the network using existing infrastructure. Infrastructure Victoria in its 30-year strategy argued the Craigieburn metropolitan line, the Shepparton regional line and the Seymour regional line would reach capacity in the 2030s, and the City Loop would be heavily congested by 2036. After the Metro Tunnel opens, services would still be constrained by the Craigieburn line sharing a single City Loop track with the Upfield line. Reconfiguration would allow both lines to run more services, and allow more frequent services on the Glen Waverley and Frankston lines.

Infrastructure Victoria envisioned Glen Waverley and Alamein services running through to the Upfield line via the Flinders Street Viaduct and Frankston services running through to the Craigieburn line via the reconfigured City Loop track pair, which differs from the post-reconfiguration network outlined in stage 4 of the 2012 Network Development Plan.

The reconfiguration would also allow for suburban extensions of the rail network, including extending the Upfield line to the northern growth suburbs of Donnybrook, Beveridge and Wallan. Infrastructure Victoria recommended the state government complete a business case into the project.

Layout
The City Loop consists of four independent single-track tunnels, and services operate as four balloon loops, two of which operate one way during the morning and the other way in the afternoon. The City Loop has four tracks on two levels and all stations have four platforms. The four tunnels have portals on both the eastern and western ends of the city centre. The Burnley and Caulfield tunnels run mostly parallel to each other, beginning at Richmond and ending at Southern Cross. The Clifton Hill tunnel's Western End begins at Southern Cross, the tunnel is the only one that serves as a full loop, as the tunnel splits into two after Parliament branching off to both Jolimont and Flinders Street.

Services and direction of travel

All metropolitan lines on the Melbourne rail network except for the Stony Point line serve Flinders Street station, but not all of these lines serve the City Loop. Trains on the Frankston line operate to Werribee and Williamstown via Flinders Street while Sandringham services operate directly to Flinders Street in both directions. 

The eleven remaining metropolitan lines serve the City Loop and are organised into four separate groups: Burnley, Caulfield, Clifton Hill, and Northern. Each group has its own dedicated single track tunnel, and carries several lines. The Alamein, Belgrave, Craigieburn, Cranbourne, Glen Waverley, Hurstbridge, Lilydale, Mernda, Pakenham, Sunbury, and Upfield lines all run through the Loop, although some services run direct to Flinders Street station.

Stopping patterns alternate during weekdays on the Northern and Burnley Groups, with trains switching directions at during the day, whereas on the Clifton Hill and Caulfield groups remain consistent all day.

Burnley group

The Burnley group consists of the Belgrave, Lilydale, Alamien, and Glen Waverley railway lines. The line is one of two that change operations in the middle of the day. Trains operate anti-clockwise through the loop during weekday mornings and clockwise during weekday afternoons and weekends. Citybound trains from Glen Waverley will not travel via the City Loop on weekday mornings and will instead travel direct to Flinders Street. During afternoon peak Alamein and Blackburn services will run direct to and from Flinders Street, while on weekends all Alamein services terminate at Camberwell and thus do not travel via the City Loop.

Prior to 2011, Glen Waverley trains operated via the City Loop during morning peak, while Alamein and Blackburn services operated direct to Flinders Street.

Caulfield group

The Caulfield group consists of the Pakenham and Cranbourne lines. The line operates anti-clockwise through the City Loop all day, entering the Loop at Parliament and leaving at Flinders Street.

Major changes were made to the Northern and Caulfield group tunnels in 2021. Previously, the Frankston and Sandringham lines also operated via the Caulfield tunnel. Services also operated clockwise during weekday afternoons while running anti-clockwise during weekday mornings and weekends.

When the Metro Tunnel opens in 2025, Pakenham and Cranbourne services will be pulled out of the Loop and instead will operate to Sunbury. Frankston services will return to the Loop in the Caulfield group tunnel.

Clifton Hill group

The Clifton Hill group consists of the Hurstbridge and Mernda lines. The line was the first to operate in a consistent direction all day. All services on the group operate in a clockwise direction all day, entering the city at Flinders Street and leaving after Parliament.

Prior to 2008, services operated anti-clockwise during weekday mornings similar to the Burnley Group. From 2008 to 2013 services ran clockwise on weekdays and anti-clockwise on weekends. The main reason for the current operational direction is because of the flat junction at Jolimont, which prevents inbound trains from running anti-clockwise without crossing the outbound tracks.

The Clifton Hill tunnel is the only tunnel able to operate as a full loop as the tunnel breaks off towards both Jolimont and Flinders Street after Parliament. Previously this tunnel was used to operate the full time City Circle train line that ran on a permanent loop around the CBD, however in 1993 this service replaced by the surface-level City Circle tram. The tunnel is still used partially as an alternative form of transport in cases where some lines are temporarily shut down.

Northern group
The Northern group consists of the Craigieburn, Sunbury, and Upfield lines. Services operate clockwise on weekday mornings and weekends and operate anti-clockwise during weekday afternoons and evenings.

On 31 January 2021, there were major changes to the Northern and Caulfield group tunnels. Prior to this, Werribee services also operated through the loop during weekends, but the line was rerouted to operate to Frankston to increase service reliability on both the Cross-City and Northern groups.

In 2025, Sunbury services will cease operation in the City Loop and will instead connect with the Pakenham and Cranbourne lines via the new Metro Tunnel, allowing greater service frequency on the Craigieburn and Upfield lines.

Summary table

Stations

The City Loop has three underground railway stations at Parliament, Melbourne Central, and Flagstaff. The stations were opened in the 1980s, with Melbourne Central being the oldest, opening in 1981, and Flagstaff the last to open in 1985. Each railway station features four tracks with two island platforms stacked on top of each other.

Parliament
Parliament station opened in 1983 and serves the eastern end of the CBD. The station has entrances on Lonsdale Street and on Macarthur Street. The station gets its name from its proximity to the Parliament of Victoria. The station has interchanges with three tram routes on Nicholson Street and two tram routes on Macarthur Street.

Melbourne Central

Melbourne Central opened in 1981 as Museum Station. The station received its original name from the Melbourne Museum, which was located within the State Library of Victoria. The station's name was change in 1997 to Melbourne Central following the 1991 redevelopment of the site above the station to Melbourne Central Shopping Centre and the relocation of the Melbourne Museum to a new building in Carlton Gardens. Melbourne Central station is unique as it has only one direct street-facing entrance to the station on Elizabeth Street, with a second entrance located inside of the shopping centre. The station interchanges with 15 bus routes on Lonsdale Street, three tram routes on Elizabeth street, eight tram routes on Swanston Street and two tram routes on La Trobe Street.

Flagstaff
Flagstaff station opened in 1985 and serves the Western end of the CBD. The station owes its name because of its proximity to Flagstaff Gardens, which is just north of the station. The station features two entrances on the William/La Trobe street intersection. The station interchanges with two tram routes on Latrobe Street and two tram routes on William Street

References

External links

Public Transport Victoria
Zen and the City Loop (a more detailed explanation of the five train direction configurations)
Department of Transport – City Loop history and photo page
Railpage – Publicity leaflets circa 1970
Metro Trains Melbourne website

Railway lines opened in 1981
Tunnels completed in 1981
Railway lines in Melbourne
Railway tunnels in Victoria (Australia)
Railway loop lines
Underground commuter rail
Melbourne City Centre
Public transport routes in the City of Melbourne (LGA)